was a professional Go player.

Biography 
Shimamura reached 9 dan in 1960. He was a teacher to many players including Hane Yasumasa, Yamashiro Hiroshi, Nakano Hironari, Imamura Yoshiaki, Shimamura Michiro, Shigeno Yuki, and Matsumoto Nayoko.

Titles and runners-up

References

1912 births
1991 deaths
Japanese Go players